Ignacio "Nacho" Maganto Pérez (born 2 January 1992) is a Spanish footballer who currently plays for AD Unión Adarve the 2a RFEF.

Career

Youth, College and Amateur
Maganto spent five seasons in the Getafe youth system. Maganto was offered a contract to play for Getafe's B team but instead elected to move to the United States to play football on a scholarship at Iona College.  In his four seasons with the Gaels, he made a total of 71 appearances and tallied 27 goals and 14 assists.

He also played in the Premier Development League with Reading United, making a total of 9 appearances and tallied 2 goals.

Professional

LA Galaxy
On 15 January 2015, Maganto was selected 21st overall in the 2015 MLS SuperDraft by the LA Galaxy.  He signed a professional contract with the club two months later.  On 22 March, Maganto made his professional debut with USL affiliate club LA Galaxy II in a 0–0 draw against Real Monarchs SLC. On 19 April, Maganto made another appearance with LA Galaxy II against Austin Aztex FC that ended in a 2–1 victory for the Galaxy.

On 2 May 2015, Maganto made his debut for the first team, starting on the left side of midfield, against Colorado Rapids. Maganto ended his debut early when he was substituted off in the 72nd minute for goal scorer Alan Gordon as the Galaxy completed the game with a 1–1 draw. On 28 May, Magnato played the full 90 minutes for the first time in the home match against Real Salt Lake that ended in a 1–0 win for the Galaxy. Maganto scored a one-touch goal, his first for the Galaxy, in an away game against New England Revolution that ended in a 2–2 draw on 31 May.

He was waived by LA Galaxy on 29 February 2016.

Hajduk Split
Maganto joined Croatian side Hajduk Split on trial in mid-June 2016, eventually signing with the club on 26 July 2016. After 9 league appearances, of which two were in the starting line-up, Maganto was released by Hajduk on 7 January 2017.

Career statistics

References

http://www.lagalaxy.com/post/2015/12/14/la-galaxy-insider-year-review-midfielders

External links

Iona Gaels bio

1992 births
Living people
Spanish footballers
Footballers from the Community of Madrid
Association football midfielders
UD San Sebastián de los Reyes players
Major League Soccer players
USL League Two players
USL Championship players
Iona Gaels men's soccer players
Reading United A.C. players
LA Galaxy players
LA Galaxy II players
HNK Hajduk Split players
CD Paracuellos Antamira players
Croatian Football League players
LA Galaxy draft picks
Spanish expatriate footballers
Spanish expatriate sportspeople in the United States
Expatriate soccer players in the United States
Spanish expatriate sportspeople in Croatia
Expatriate footballers in Croatia